John Robinson Benson (1836–1885) was a politician in Queensland, Australia. He was a Member of the Queensland Legislative Assembly.

Early life 
Benson was born 1836 in Armagh, Ireland. After attending Queen's University, Ontario Benson migrated to Queensland and established a medical practice in 1867.

Politics 
Benson represented the electoral district of Clermont from 4 May 1870 to 6 September 1870. Benson was critical of the existing Legislative Assembly, advocated for separation of North Queensland from the rest of the state, and reform of the Land Act, Immigration Act and Pastoral Leases Act.

Later life 
Benson died in St Kilda, Melbourne on 25 July 1885.

References

Members of the Queensland Legislative Assembly
1836 births
1885 deaths
People from Queensland
19th-century Australian politicians
Irish emigrants to colonial Australia